Alexia Runggaldier (born 27 November 1991) is an Italian former biathlete. She competed at the Biathlon World Championships 2012 and 2013. She represented Italy at the 2014 Winter Olympics in Sochi and at the 2018 Winter Olympics in PyeongChang.

Record

World Championships

Olympics

References

External links

1991 births
Living people
Biathletes at the 2014 Winter Olympics
Biathletes at the 2018 Winter Olympics
Italian female biathletes
Olympic biathletes of Italy
Ladin people
Biathlon World Championships medalists
Sportspeople from Brixen
Biathletes of Fiamme Oro